Emma King (born 28 June 1994) is an Australian rules footballer playing for the North Melbourne Football Club in the AFL Women's competition.

Early life and state league football
King began playing competitive football at the age of eight. In her junior years she would play for Quinns Districts Football Club in Perth, before moving on to play in Western Australia's youth girls competition at the age of fourteen.

King plays state league football with the Coastal Titans in the West Australian Women's Football League. She was a member of the club's 2015 premiership team. As part of her AFLW contract she is required to return to the club at the conclusion of the national league season.

She played with the club's representative team again in 2016 as part of the women's all-star match.

King is also a two-time Western Australian state representative.

AFL Women's career

Collingwood
She made her league debut in round 1, 2017, in the club and the league's inaugural match at Ikon Park against . In round 2, she recorded a league best thirty-three hit-outs. She was praised in the media for her match by Collingwood coach Wayne Siekman.

At the end of the season, King was listed in the 2017 All-Australian team. On 19 May 2017, King was signed by Collingwood for the 2018 AFLW season.

North Melbourne
After two seasons at Collingwood, King joined  who entered the AFLW competition in 2019. It was revealed she signed on with the club for two more seasons on 17 June 2021, tying her to the club until the end of 2023. King achieved selection in Champion Data's 2021 AFLW All-Star stats team, after leading the league for the best hitout-to-advantage to rate, with a rate of 24.1 percent.

Statistics
 Statistics are correct to the end of the 2021 season

|- style="background-color: #eaeaea"
! scope="row" style="text-align:center" | 2017
|
| 60 || 7 || 0 || 1 || 28 || 14 || 42 || 7 || 8 || bgcolor=FA8072 | 199§ || 0.0 || 0.1 || 4.0 || 2.0 || 6.0 || 1.0 || 1.1 || bgcolor=FA8072 | 28.4§ || 3
|- 
! scope="row" style="text-align:center" | 2018
|
| 60 || 7 || 1 || 2 || 49 || 7 || 56 || 15 || 14 || 125 || 0.1 || 0.3 || 7.0 || 1.0 || 8.0 || 2.1 || 2.0 || 17.9 || 0
|- style="background-color: #eaeaea"
! scope="row" style="text-align:center" | 2019
|
| 60 || 7 || 8 || 5 || 34 || 14 || 48 || 15 || 23 || 125 || 1.1 || 0.7 || 4.9 || 2.0 || 6.9 || 2.1 || 3.3 || 17.9 || 7
|- 
! scope="row" style="text-align:center" | 2020
|
| 60 || 7 || 4 || 3 || 27 || 16 || 43 || 10 || 25 || 66 || 0.6 || 0.4 || 3.9 || 2.3 || 6.1 || 1.4 || 3.6 || 9.4 || 0
|- style="background-color: #eaeaea"
! scope="row" style="text-align:center" | 2021
|
| 60 || 10 || 6 || 4 || 41 || 27 || 68 || 22 || 20 || bgcolor=FFBBFF | 194‡ || 0.6 || 0.4 || 4.1 || 2.7 || 6.8 || 2.2 || 2.0 || 19.4 || 4
|- class="sortbottom"
! colspan=3| Career
! 38
! 19
! 15
! 179
! 78
! 257
! 69
! 90
! 709
! 0.5
! 0.4
! 4.7
! 2.1
! 6.8
! 1.8
! 2.4
! 18.7
! 14
|}

Personal life
Outside of football King has a university degree in architecture. She is also a member of the AFL Players Association women's advisory committee.

She has a twin sister and together they are one of two sets of twins in the same family.

References

External links 

Living people
1994 births
Collingwood Football Club (AFLW) players
Australian rules footballers from Perth, Western Australia
Sportswomen from Western Australia
All-Australians (AFL Women's)
North Melbourne Football Club (AFLW) players